Amakohia - Ubi is an autonomous community in the Owerri West Local Government area of Imo State (1). The community is divided into four villages which includes; Umunjam, Obiọkwu, Umuike, and Umuọka. Each of these villages which later became 'towns' has between four to eight kindreds. Amakọhia - Ubi, originally, Amakọhia-Ubi was a village in Umunwọha Ọfọ Ise (Children of Nwọha) community comprising Ohii, Amakohia-Ubi, Ndegwu, Orogwe, and Irete in order of seniority, until each of them was recognized as autonomous by the People's Democratic Party-led Government.  Each of these officially known as 'Autonomous Community' was granted the right to choose a traditional ruler according to government procedures establishing the autonmous community status.

Populated places in Imo State